Hama GmbH & Co KG is a German distributor of accessories specialising in a number of areas including photo, video, audio, multimedia, computer and telecommunications. The company also acts as a distributor of various product ranges. Hama employs around 2,500 people worldwide, 1,500 employees work at the headquarters in Monheim, Bavaria, Germany. Hama is represented by 17 subsidiaries and numerous commercial agencies in Europe and beyond.

Among the products Hama manufacture are:
Filters
Tripods
Memory cards
Camera bags
Headphones
Flash and studio accessories
AV cables (coaxial and SCART)
along with various computer accessories including peripherals and USB, FireWire, and Ethernet cables and other miscellaneous items.

History

Formation 
In 1923, the 18-year-old photographer Martin Hanke founded the Hamaphot KG (limited partnership) in Dresden, which specialized in photo accessories. When Dresden was bombarded in the Second World War, the company was destroyed. It was rebuilt in Monheim in 1945. In 1958, the first synchronized flash powder device was presented, in 1972 the world's first automatic film splicer. Three years later, the "Hamafix" slide mounting system came onto the market. In 1990, Hama established their UK branch Hama PVAC Ltd. (Hama Photo, Video, Audio, Communications) and are UK distributor for Celestron, Tasco, Sandisk, Vivitar and Koss products. In 1991, Hama launched the "Videocut 200" which - according to company representatives – was the most frequently sold video editing device in Europe at that time. In 1993, the company name changed from Hamaphot to Hama. Two years later, the "MobileSafe" mobile phone holder was put on the market. In 1998, the company celebrated its seventy-fifth anniversary.

Today, the product range does not only comprise articles for photo and video applications, but also accessories from the areas of audiovisual, multimedia, game console, telecommunications and from a number of more areas.

Scandals 
In early 2008, over 30,000 flash drives built by a fraudulent Chinese supplier were distributed by Hama. The flash drives were manipulated to overreport their capacity to the computer, possibly leading to data loss upon attempted writing to physically nonexistent sectors, which usually initially is unnoticed by users. Upon discovery, a product recall was launched.

Well-known Hama products

References

External links 
Hama website

Photography equipment
German brands
Photography companies of Germany
Companies based in Bavaria
Companies based in Dresden
Videotelephony
Manufacturing companies established in 1923